Russell's Water  is a hamlet about  north of Henley-on-Thames in South Oxfordshire. There is 20th-century and older housing, a village hall, an area of common land called Russell's Water Common to the east and a large duck pond. The pond featured in the 1968 film Chitty Chitty Bang Bang and cast members Adrian Hall and Heather Ripley returned to the location for a TV documentary about the making of the film in 2004.

References

Hamlets in Oxfordshire